Going Berserk is a 1983 American-Canadian comedy film starring John Candy, Joe Flaherty, and Eugene Levy and directed by David Steinberg.

Plot
John Bourgignon is an amiable chauffeur and would-be drummer who is engaged to the daughter Nancy, of an extremely disapproving United States congressman Ed Reese. As the wedding date approaches, Bourgignon's sleazy film-director friend Sal DiPasquale, blackmails the senator into allowing him to record the ceremony, while Bourgignon runs afoul of a motorcycle gang and later finds himself kicked out onto the nighttime city streets while handcuffed to a dead man Muhammed Jerome Willy. Worst of all, a local aerobics studio has become the front for an inept religious cult which has targeted the senator for assassination, and attempts to drug and brainwash Bourgignon into killing his future father-in-law during the wedding ceremony. In the end, with the questionable help of his even more hapless friend, Chick Leff, Bourgignon more or less saves the day, and more or less lives happily ever after.

Cast
 John Candy as John Bourgignon
 Joe Flaherty as Chick Leff
 Eugene Levy as Sal DiPasquale
 Alley Mills as Nancy Reese
 Pat Hingle as Ed Reese
 Richard Libertini as Reverend Sun Yi Day
 Paul Dooley as Dr. Ted
 Dixie Carter as Angela
 Eve Brent Ashe as Mrs. Reese
 Ann Bronston as Patti Reese
 Murphy Dunne as Public Defender
 Kathy Bendett as News Reporter
 Elizabeth Kerr as Grandmother Reese
 Dan Barrows as Minister
 Brenda Currin as Sal's Secretary
 Frantz Turner as Wallace
 Gloria Gifford as Francine
 Bill Saluga as Skipper / Kung Fu Leader
 Ernie Hudson as Muhammed Jerome Willy
 Kurtwood Smith as Clarence
 Julius Harris as The Judge
 Elinor Donahue as Margaret Anderson

Reception
The New York Times review stated, "John Candy is easily the funniest thing in Going Berserk, an affably stupid comedy that's saddled with too much plot and that hasn't nearly enough energy to go with it." Vulture Hound wrote, "Going Berserk co-written by Dana Olsen misses the mark with its bare minimum of plot to get us from scene to scene that reference films/tv shows you’d rather being watching than this movie."

References

External links
 
 

1983 films
1980s English-language films
1983 comedy films
Universal Pictures films
American crime comedy films
Canadian crime comedy films
Films scored by Tom Scott
1980s American films
1980s Canadian films